Spencer, later titled Under One Roof, is an American sitcom television series created by Sy Rosen, that was broadcast on NBC for one season from December 1, 1984 until May 11, 1985.

History and description
The show originally starred Chad Lowe as high school student Spencer Winger, Mimi Kennedy as his mother Doris Winger, and Ronny Cox as his father George Winger.

Lowe left the series in 1985 after six episodes and was replaced by Ross Harris, who assumed the role of Spencer. At that time the show's title was changed from Spencer to Under One Roof; the first episode with the new title aired March 23, 1985. Cox also left the show during the retooling, his character written off as having left the family for a 23-year-old woman. Harold Gould and Frances Sternhagen were added to the cast as Spencer's maternal grandparents. Richard Sanders played the high school guidance counselor in the series.  Each episode would open with Spencer making some wisecrack in class,  causing the teacher to send him to his guidance counselor.

Cast
Chad Lowe as Spencer Winger (1984)
Ross Harris as Spencer Winger (1985)
Mimi Kennedy as Doris Winger
Ronny Cox as George Winger
Amy Locane as Andrea Winger
Grant Heslov as Wayne
David Greenlee as (Herbie) Bailey (pilot episode)
Dean Cameron as Bailey (episode 2 on)
Frances Sternhagen as Millie Sprague
Harold Gould as Ben Sprague
Richard Sanders as Benjamin Beanley
Beverly Archer as Miss Spier

Episodes

References

External links 

1984 American television series debuts
1985 American television series endings
1980s American high school television series
1980s American teen sitcoms
English-language television shows
Television series about families
Television series about teenagers
Television shows set in Connecticut
NBC original programming